The lateral intermuscular septum of thigh is a fold of deep fascia in the thigh.

It is between the vastus lateralis and biceps femoris.

It separates the anterior compartment of the thigh from the posterior compartment of the thigh.

See also
Medial intermuscular septum of thigh
Anterior compartment of thigh
Posterior compartment of thigh

References

External links
 Topographical Anatomy of the Lower Limb - Listed Alphabetically from UAMS Department of Neurobiology and Developmental Sciences
 Anatomy Tables - Anterior & Medial Thigh from anatomy.med.umich.edu

Lower limb anatomy